This is a list of diplomatic missions of Belarus. Belarus has been the most eager nation of the former USSR to integrate more closely and to re-engage with former Soviet states, and this is reflected in the location of its missions. The website of the Ministry of Foreign Affairs calls the equivalent of its consulates in Russia "divisions".

Current missions

Africa

Americas

Asia

Europe

Multilateral organisations
 Geneva (delegation to the United Nations and other international bodies)
 New York City (delegation to the United Nations)
 Paris (delegation to UNESCO)
 Strasbourg (delegation to the European Union)

Gallery

Closed missions

Africa

Americas

Europe

Oceania

See also
Foreign relations of Belarus
List of diplomatic missions in Belarus
Visa policy of Belarus

Notes

References

Links
Ministry of Foreign Affairs of the Republic of Belarus

 
Belarus
Diplomatic missions